Ilampuyal is a 2009 Indian Tamil language film directed by K. S. Thurai. The film stars his son Vashanth Sellathurai, Poornitha, Karunas, Sriman, Ravishankar and Sinthuraj.  The music was composed by Vashanth Sellathurai. 

The film premiered in 20 Danish theatres in October 2007. The film was released 1 May 2009. Satellite rights went to Kalaignar TV.

Cast 
Vashanth Sellathurai as Puyal Ezhilan 
 Poornitha as Thendral Bose
 Karunas as Narayanan
 Sriman as Sathies Shankar
 K. S. Thurai as Vikneshwar
Ravishankar 
Sinthuraj as Paandiyan Gobal
Sujibala
Ravi Sugathevan as Iniyan Bose
Morten Bergholt as a journalist
Tommy Krabe Andersen
Uldus as Nila Amaran in a special appearance

Production 
K. S. Thurai, a Sri Lankan Tamil residing in Denmark who previously directed Pookkal (2004) and stage shows in Europe, directs this film. His son, Vashanth, a computer engineer, played the lead role in the film, composed the music and did the graphic works. The film was made on a low budget and highlights the issues Sri Lankan Tamil refugees face. Ilampuyal was shot in Denmark and Chennai, India over a period of 85 days in 2007. The Carl-Henning Pedersen Museum was used as a house for one of the main characters.  Journalist Morten Bergholt played himself in the film. A Thiruvalluvar statue was erected on one of Denmark's islands for the film.

Soundtrack

References

Extnerla links 
On the way to Kollywood 1
On the way to Kollywood 2
2009 films
2000s Tamil-language films